Robert Reed Church Jr. (October 26, 1885 – April 17, 1952) was a prominent businessman and political organizer in Tennessee. His father was the successful businessman Robert Reed Church, and Church Jr. succeeded his father as president of the Solvent Savings Bank and Trust Company after his father's death. An African American, he organized the first NAACP branch in Tennessee and was a member of the NAACP national board of directors. From the 1910s to 1940s, he was one of the most powerful political figures in his hometown of Memphis. Church moved to Washington, D.C., in 1940, where he became a member of the board of directors of the Fair Employment Practice Committee. Church's half sister was the activist Mary Church Terrell.

Personal life
Church was born on October 26, 1885 to Robert Reed Church and Anna Susan Wright. He had one sister, Annette Elaine. Mary Church Terrell, the well-known civil rights activist and suffragist, was his half-sister, born from his father's first marriage to Louisa Ayres. Church was educated at parochial schools in Memphis and by private tutors. He later attended Morgan Park Military Academy in Morgan Park, Illinois, and at the Berlin and Parkard School of Business in New York. After schooling, he worked for two years on Wall Street.

Church married Sara P. Johnson of Washington, D.C., in DC on July 26, 1911. They had one child, daughter Sara Roberta Church. Church died of a heart attack on April 17, 1952.

Career
Church's career in Memphis began as a cashier at his father's Solvent Savings Bank and Trust Company. When his father died in 1912, he succeeded him as president. He later resigned to manage extensive real-estate holdings.

In 1916, Church founded the Lincoln League in Memphis to organize African-American political power, helping to organize voter registration drives, voting schools, and paying poll taxes. The League sponsored a ticket in the 1916 election in Memphis, losing at the ballot box but establishing the importance of the group. Church's national political reputation also grew. Church was a delegate to the Republican National Convention eight times, starting in 1912. In 1917, Church organized a Memphis branch of the NAACP, the first branch in Tennessee. Church became a member of the national board of directors of the organization in 1919, representing fourteen southern states.

At the peak of his career, Church was known as the "Colossus of Beale Street". He assisted in directing presidential campaigns for Republican party candidates in 1920, 1924, 1928, and 1936. As his activities were central in the Republican vote in Tennessee, he became an important figure in patronage appointments in West Tennessee during the presidential administrations of Warren G. Harding, Calvin Coolidge, and Herbert Hoover. Church was credited with putting Harry S. New into the cabinet of Calvin Coolidge as postmaster general in 1923.

By 1920, Church's power was increasingly being challenged by Memphis Democratic leader E. H. Crump. The two became leaders of opposing factions in Memphis, with Josiah T. Settle, Jr, George Klepper, and Baily Walsh being Church's chief assistants. Church also saw opposition within the Republican Party in Tennessee. For example, Church's attendance at the 1928 Republican National Convention in Chicago was strongly opposed, but he eventually was seated. Church's faction occasionally supported Democrats in Memphis politics, as the Republican Party was increasingly unable to succeed in city-wide elections. One noted example was family friend Watkins Overton, who was Memphis's mayor from 1928-1939. Other key allies in Western Tennessee included Perry Howard, Roscoe Simmons, Emmett Scott, John R. Hawkins, James A. Cobb, and L. K. Williams.

In 1940, Church's economic and political power in Memphis was greatly reduced when the city administration seized Church's real-estate holdings and instituted a campaign of harassment against businesses allied with Church. As a result, Church moved to Washington, D.C., where he continued to work for civil rights and the Republican Party. After Church moved to DC, his real-estate office on Beale Street was occupied by Atlanta Life Insurance Company managed by Church ally George W. Lee.

References

1885 births
1952 deaths
African-American businesspeople
Businesspeople from Tennessee
Tennessee Republicans
20th-century American businesspeople
20th-century African-American people
Washington, D.C., Republicans